TS Ostrovia Ostrów Wielkopolski is a Polish professional women's basketball club that was founded in 1996 in the city of Ostrów Wielkopolski.TS Ostrovia Ostrów Wielkopolski plays in the Basket Liga Kobiet, the highest competition in Poland.

Current roster

References

External links
 Official Website

Women's basketball teams in Poland
Sport in Ostrów Wielkopolski
Basketball teams established in 1996